The Boca and Loyalton Railroad was built to serve sawmills in the Sierra Nevada of northern California. It became the Loyalton branch of the Western Pacific Railroad.

History
The Lewis brothers built a standard gauge railway about 1897 from the Southern Pacific early transcontinental line at Boca, California, seventeen miles north to their sawmill in Sardine Valley. The sawmill was moved to Loyalton, California after the Sardine Valley forests were cut, and the rail line was extended to Loyalton as the Boca & Loyalton on 24 September 1900. The railroad was soon extended northwesterly from Loyalton to Beckwourth and Portola, California. The Western Pacific Railroad purchased the Boca & Loyalton line from Portola to Beckwourth as part of its main line constructed through the area in 1908. Much of the timber had been cut in the Loyalton area by 1916, and commodities formerly shipped through Loyalton to or from the Southern Pacific were being carried by the Western Pacific. Trackage over the summit between Loyalton and Boca was abandoned that year, and Western Pacific began operating the line north of Loyalton as their Loyalton branch.

Locomotives

Clover Valley Lumber Company
Clover Valley Lumber Company was organized in 1917 to take over the Loyalton area sawmills as local timber resources became scarce. It operated a number of forest railway branches in the area from 1921 until 1957.

References

Logging railroads in the United States
Predecessors of the Western Pacific Railroad
Transportation in Nevada County, California
Transportation in Plumas County, California
Transportation in Sierra County, California
Defunct California railroads
History of Nevada County, California
History of Plumas County, California
History of Sierra County, California